The Trans-Mississippi Department was a geographical subdivision of the Confederate States Army comprising Arkansas, Missouri, Texas, western Louisiana, Arizona Territory and the Indian Territory; i.e. all of the Confederacy west of the Mississippi River. It was the last military department to surrender to United States forces in 1865.

History 
The Trans-Mississippi Department was established on May 26, 1862, at Little Rock, Arkansas. It absorbed the previously established Trans-Mississippi District (Department Number Two) which had been organized on January 10, 1862, to include the Indian Territory, Missouri, Arkansas (except for the country east of St. Francis County, Arkansas, to Scott County), Missouri, and that part of Louisiana north of the Red river. The Trans-Mississippi Department had its headquarters at Shreveport, Louisiana, and Houston, Texas. It was responsible for the Confederate theater of operations west of the Mississippi. Its forces were sometimes referred to as "Army of the Southwest" and, as a result of being largely cut off from the Confederate government in Richmond late in the War, became popularly known as "Kirby-Smithdom".

Commanding generals 
 Brigadier-General Paul O. Hébert (May 26, 1862June 20, 1862)
 Major-General John B. Magruder (assigned June 20, 1862, but did not accept)
 Major-General Thomas C. Hindman (June 20, 1862July 16, 1862)
 Lieutenant-General Theophilus H. Holmes (July 30, 1862February 9, 1863)
 General E. Kirby Smith (March 7, 1863April 19, 1865)
 Lieutenant-General Simon Bolivar Buckner (April 19, 1865April 22, 1865)
 General E. Kirby Smith (April 22, 1865May 26, 1865)

References

Further reading 
 

 
1862 establishments in Arkansas
1865 disestablishments in Texas
History of Houston
History of Shreveport, Louisiana
Military history of Little Rock, Arkansas
Military units and formations established in 1862
Military units and formations disestablished in 1865